Respect is the fourth studio album by American basketball player and rapper Shaquille O'Neal. It was released on September 15, 1998 through T.W.IsM./A&M Records. Production was handled by DJ Clark Kent, DJ Quik, Duran Ramos, Dutch, Japhe Tejeda, Ken Bailey, Majah League, Rodney Jerkins, Russell "Russ Prez" Pressley, Sean "Barney" Thomas and The Storm. It features guest appearances from K-Raw, Peter Gunz, Sonja Blade, 1 Accord, Deadly Venoms, Loon, Public Announcement, Sauce Money and Trigga, as well as O'Neal's Los Angeles Lakers teammate Kobe Bryant performs at the start of the track "3 X's Dope", though his name was not listed on the credits. The album had 19 tracks, that Vibe said all "straddle the line between mediocre and unlistenable".

It peaked at number 58 on the Billboard 200 and number 8 on the Top R&B/Hip-Hop Albums. The album sold 104,000 units.

Track listing

Charts

References

External links

1998 albums
A&M Records albums
Shaquille O'Neal albums
Albums produced by DJ Quik
Albums produced by Rodney Jerkins
Albums produced by Clark Kent (producer)